Pollia may refer to:
Pollia (gastropod), a sea snail genus
Pollia (plant), a plant genus
 Pollia gens, an ancient Roman family
Pollia, a Roman tribe